Arthur Howard (1910–1995) was a British film and television actor.

Arthur Howard may also refer to:

Arthur Howard (English cricketer) (1882–1946), English cricketer active in 1921
Arthur Howard (New Zealand cricketer) (1866–1951), New Zealand cricketer
Arthur Howard (South African cricketer) (born 1936), South African cricketer active in 1961
Arthur Howard (politician) (1896–1971), British Member of Parliament for Westminster St George's, 1945–1950
Arthur Howard, American television actor; starred in Square One Television
Arthur Howard, American artist; cover artist for Ginger Pye
Arthur L. Howard (1846–1901), expert in early machine guns
Arthur B. Howard (1838–1907), American horticulturalist